Cumbalum is a town located in the Northern Rivers Region of New South Wales.

Demographics
The median age of persons in West Ballina was 37 years. There were less males than females, with 47.8% of the population male and 52.2% female. The average household size was 2.2 people per household.

References 

Towns in New South Wales
Northern Rivers
Ballina Shire